Sérgio Henrique Saboia Bernardes (born May 18, 1973) is a former Brazilian football player.

Embu graduated from Corithnians' youth academy, and made 65 appearances for the senior side, including playing in Campeonato Brasileiro Série A, before leaving for Japan.

Club statistics

References

External links

1973 births
Living people
Brazilian footballers
J1 League players
Tokyo Verdy players
Sport Club Corinthians Paulista players
Brazilian expatriate footballers
Expatriate footballers in Japan
Association football midfielders